Vilana is a white Greek wine grape variety. Vilana may also refer to
Vilana Udagama, a village in Sri Lanka 
Vilana Pallegama, a village in Sri Lanka 
Vilana (surname)